Mary Island State Park is a  state park located in the St. Lawrence River in Jefferson County, New York. The park is situated in the Town of Alexandria on the east end of Wellesley Island, and is accessible only by boat.

History
Mary Island State Park was purchased by the New York State Fisheries, Game and Forest Commission in 1897. Along with Canoe-Picnic Point State Park, it was one of the first New York state parks established along the St. Lawrence River as part of the St. Lawrence Reservation, a recreation area within the Thousand Islands region authorized by New York State in 1896.

Description
Mary Island State Park is accessible only by boat. The park offers picnic tables, fishing, a boat launch and docks, and a campground for tents only. It is open from Memorial Day to Labor Day.

See also
 List of New York state parks

References

External links
 New York State Parks: Mary Island State Park

State parks of New York (state)
Parks in Jefferson County, New York